Jean-François Douis (born 3 May 1950) is a French former professional footballer who played as a midfielder and forward.

Personal life 
Jean-François Douis is the younger brother of former France international Yvon Douis.

After retiring from football in 1979, Douis became a commercial agent for Adidas and Le Coq Sportif for 20 years. In 1999, he became a physical educator in the town of Saint-Médard-en-Jalles.

Career statistics

References 

1950 births
Living people
French footballers
Association football midfielders
Association football forwards
Ligue 1 players
Ligue 2 players
FC Rouen players
OGC Nice players
Paris Saint-Germain F.C. players
Sportspeople from Eure